Total Access Communication Public Company Limited, commonly known as DTAC is a GSM mobile phone company in Thailand. It is the nation's third largest GSM phone company, after AIS and True.  DTAC is owned by Norwegian company Telenor both directly and indirectly, and both companies share the same logo. , DTAC had 23.2 million subscribers with a market share of subscribers at around 30 percent. As of 2019, the company has 20.642 million mobile subscriptions and 3904 employees. It is listed on the Singapore Exchange and the Stock Exchange of Thailand.

In 2015 DTAC reported total assets of 110,965 million baht, with revenues of 87,753 million baht, and a net profit of 5,893 million baht.

As of 11 April 2012, DTAC's parent company became BCTN Holding.

DTAC has won the "Best Mobile Operator of Thailand" award for three consecutive years (2005–2007) from Asian MobileNews Awards 2007, organized by Asian MobileNews Magazine.

On November 22, 2021, Telenor and Charoen Pokphand Group, officially announced they have agreed to explore a USD 8.6 billion merger plan between Thailand’s second and third largest telecom operators (by subscribers), True Corporation (TRUE) and Total Access Communication (DTAC) – The proposed merger is subject to regulatory approvals. The merger is expected to be completed by late-September 2022.  The merger was "acknowledged" by the regulator NBTC at a meeting on October 20, 2022. The newly merged company still retain the True Corporation name, which was founded on March 1, 2023 and it was listed on the Stock Exchange of Thailand under the stock ticker symbol TRUE on March 3, 2023.

Services and coverage 

DTAC claims to have the second-widest coverage nationwide, compared to its main rival AIS, with more than 13,000 base stations installed as of 2016 on the 850 MHz, 1800 MHz and 2100 MHz bands.

As of 2013 DTAC is offering both EDGE and 3G services on its postpaid and prepaid brands DTAC Happy.  Unlimited Internet access stands at a price of 999 baht per month or 49 baht per day (numerous cheaper hourly packages are available, and, in 2010, traffic-based packages were also introduced, obviously due to the increasing popularity of smartphones).  DTAC has international roaming agreements with 147 countries.

Currently DTAC is offering 3G commercial service as seen on this coverage map.  3G+ service can be used with 3G+ compatible mobile devices (WCDMA 850 and 2100 and/or HSPA/HSPA+ 850 and 2100) with speeds of up to 42 Mbit/s.

4G LTE service is available as of 2014 on the 2100 MHz band, and the enhanced 4G LTE service on the 1800 MHz and 2100 MHz bands (Not Carrier Aggregation) has been available in the major areas of Bangkok since October 2015 and had extended their coverage level to the major areas of the country since March 2016, and claims to have their 4G LTE coverage nationwide within the end of 2016. DTAC claims to have their 4G LTE network 3 times faster than before.

In February 2020, the company announced plans to launch first home-based ultra-high-speed broadband service by June on the 26-gigahertz range it secured in the 5G spectrum licence auction.

Subsidiaries
DTAC includes the following subsidiaries :
 DTAC TriNet, operates on 2100 MHz 3G and 4G.
 DTAC Phone
DTAC Accelerate (now discontinued)

Competitors
 AIS
 my by NT (formerly my by CAT)
 NT Mobile (formerly TOT3G)
 True Move (formerly Orange)
 TrueMove H

See also 
 Paysbuy
 Telenor

References

External links 
 

Mobile phone companies of Thailand
True Corporation
Telenor
Companies established in 1989
Companies listed on the Stock Exchange of Thailand
Companies listed on the Singapore Exchange
Companies based in Bangkok
Thai brands
1989 establishments in Thailand